Clay Quartermain is a fictional character, a secret agent appearing in American comic books published by Marvel Comics.

Publication history
Created by writer-artist Jim Steranko, he first appeared in Strange Tales #163 (December 1967).

Clay Quartermain appears as an agent of the fictional espionage agency S.H.I.E.L.D., beginning in the feature "Nick Fury, Agent of S.H.I.E.L.D." in Marvel Comics' Strange Tales in 1967, and continuing into the subsequent series Nick Fury, Agent of S.H.I.E.L.D. in 1968. He became the S.H.I.E.L.D. liaison to General Thunderbolt Ross's "Hulkbusters" military program, and a supporting character in The Incredible Hulk (vol. 2), beginning with issue #187 (May 1975). A Life Model Decoy (LMD) replica of Quartermain was a featured character in the 1988 miniseries Nick Fury vs. S.H.I.E.L.D.. Quartermain has since had guest appearances in issues of Alias, Cable, The Defenders, Marvel Team-Up, The Pulse, Silver Sable and the Wild Pack, and the miniseries Secret War; in the "Nick Fury" feature in the omnibus Marvel Holiday Special (January 1994); and in the "Elite Agents of S.H.I.E.L.D." feature in the one-shot Captain America 2000 (Nov. 2000). He also led the S.H.I.E.L.D. Paranormal Containment Unit in the 2005–2006 series Nick Fury's Howling Commandos.

Fictional character biography
Clay Quartermain is a high-ranking agent of the fictional espionage agency S.H.I.E.L.D., a "blond-haired, fast-talking, grinning Burt Lancaster" sort who first worked with that organization's storied executive director Nick Fury during S.H.I.E.L.D.'s first conflict with would-be world tyrant the Yellow Claw, later revealed to have been a robot simulacrum of that Chinese-national Mandarin. Quartermain later became part of the U.S. military's "Hulkbusters" operation, which attempted to capture and contain the Hulk.

He became a fugitive and traveled with Rick Jones and the Hulk. He met his brother, a farmer. He testified in Congress about a mass murder committed by the supervillain known as the Leader who had detonated a gamma bomb in a town to obliterate.

Once more at S.H.I.E.L.D., Quartermain, along with many other agents, was seemingly killed by a self-aware, renegade "Deltan" variety of the agency's artificial-human "Life Model Decoys", and replaced by one such LMD. The most advanced of the Deltite LMDs, it rebelled upon learning it was not human, and after several confrontations, perished.

Retconned as a former romantic interest of Jessica Jones, Quartermain later became leader of S.H.I.E.L.D.'s Paranormal Containment Unit. He was the agent sent to inform Jennifer Walters (She-Hulk) that she had been pressed into service as a S.H.I.E.L.D. agent. He next led a new incarnation of S.H.I.E.L.D.'s "Hulkbusters" unit, here She-Hulk, Agent Crimson, and Agent Cheesecake. Clay and his team then defeated the electrical entity Zzzax.

Quartermain remained an ally of Jones, using her to bring down a conspiracy against the President of the United States. He assisted Jessica in the investigation of Mattie Franklin, a young female superhero trapped in mysterious circumstances. Quartermain later led a S.H.I.E.L.D. unit that rescued Jones from a HYDRA recruitment attempt. A flashback reveals Clay befriended Jessica while she was recovering from a months-long ordeal with the Purple Man.

At a meatpacking plant, Quartermain was found, apparently dead in a suspected Red Hulk attack. The commanding officer of the crime scene was his old friend Gabe Jones. It was later revealed, however, that his actual murderer was the now-insane Doc Samson. Quartermain had inadvertently stumbled upon a plot hatched by Red Hulk and Samson, and threatened to launch a full-scale investigation. This involved the Life Model Decoy of General Thunderbolt Ross, seemingly killed during a fight with the Red Hulk; Ross was actually the Red Hulk himself.

Other versions
The Ultimate Marvel version of Clay Quartermain appears as a S.H.I.E.L.D. field agent. He was seen escorting Peter Parker out of school to respond to a major threat.

In other media
 Clay Quartermain appeared in the 1998 live-action TV movie Nick Fury: Agent of S.H.I.E.L.D., portrayed by Adrian Hughes.
 Clay Quartermain appears in The Avengers: Earth's Mightiest Heroes, voiced by Troy Baker.

References

External links
 The Grand Comics Database
 The Unofficial Handbook of Marvel Comics Creators

Characters created by Jim Steranko
Comics characters introduced in 1967
Fictional secret agents and spies
Fictional special forces personnel
Howling Commandos
Marvel Comics martial artists
S.H.I.E.L.D. agents